Jordi Guimet (born September 18, 1948, Lleida, Catalonia) is an Industrial Engineer. He is an expert on Information Technologies applied to land management, specially  related with the Cadastre, Land Use and Urban Plan, and more recently in the fields of  GIS, maps in Internet, GeoWeb and interoperability technologies.

He has worked as civil servant in the Public Administration as Deputy General Director for Information Technologies in the General Direction of the Cadastre Organization (Madrid, 1987–1991, Ministry of Economy and Finance), being in charge of the technical modernization of the Cadastre, introducing the IT and GIS technologies in all the cadastre offices and central services,  and further as Regional Cadastre Director in  Catalonia (Barcelona, 1992–2001). During this period he also  was the president of the Land Use and Valuation Coordination Committee of Catalonia, member of the Steering Committee of the “Organization of Land Use Planning Administrative Authorities (MOLA)” of the UN's Economic Commission for Europe (1994–1996) and leader of a cadastral pilot project in Russia, among other responsibilities.

At present, his most relevant activity is the development of the IDEC, the Spatial Data Infrastructure of Catalonia, created by law of the Catalan Parliament. He is a technical adviser of several governmental organizations in this field and in the cadastral and ownership registries. He collaborates as a researcher in the Autonomous University of Barcelona, in a European Project in the area of SDIs.

Associated Professor of the Polytechnic University of Catalonia (UPC) in the domain of Information systems and business management, Director of the Master on Geospatial Technologies and Systems in the Politechnical Foundation of Catalonia (UPC). Collaborator member of the UPC Research Centre for Land Policy and Valuations (Architecture Faculty). Lecturer in the Public Financial School, (1988–1996).

He is author of several technical books about GIS and Cadastre and Information Systems.

Published books
2003 - *Descripción y teoría general del Catastro* (Theory and description of the Cadastre). Edicions UPC, Barcelona. .

2000 - *Sistemas de información en las organizaciones *  (Information Systems in Organizations). Edicions UPC, Barcelona. .

1997 - *Valoración Catastral en España*  (Cadastral Valuation in Spain). Spanish and Russian versions. Tragsatec, Madrid.

1996 - *Valoración Catastral inmobiliaria de Urbana. Descripción práctica* (Real Estate Cadastral Assessment for Urbana. A practical description.). Coauthor. Second Edition, 2002, Editorial UPB, Barcelona. .

1993 - *Introducción Conceptual a los Sistemas de Información Geográfica* (Conceptual Introduction to Geographical Information Systems). Edit. Graphic Study. Madrid.

1990- 1991 *Sistemas de Inforamción para la Gestión Territorial* (Information Systems for Land Use Planning).  Coauthor. Banco de Crédito Local, Madrid. .

1988- 1990 1988-1990	Coauthor and Editor of  the following publications: *Informatización de la Cartografía Catastral*  (Computerisation of Cadastral Cartography). – Spanish Cadastre D.G.  .

References

1948 births
Living people
People from Lleida
Spanish engineers